Billups is an unincorporated community in Lowndes County, Mississippi.

According to the United States Geological Survey, variant names are Billups Gate and Billups Station. It is the site of the former Billups Gate Plantation, founded by Thomas Carleton Billups in 1852. He owned surrounding plantations that included; The Billups Mims Place, The Billups Whitfield Place, The Billups Tuttle Place and the Billups Hearon Place. Billups Station was the whistle stop for Billups Gate. The site is famous locally for the former "cheese plant" that descendants of T. C. Billups built in the 1920s. It consisted of two buildings and operated for just one year under the control of Borden Milk. It was hoped to improve the economy of the area after the arrival of the boll weevil when Jersey cows were replacing cotton as the cash crop.

References

Unincorporated communities in Lowndes County, Mississippi
Unincorporated communities in Mississippi